The 2013 King's Cup is an international football tournament that will be held in Thailand from 23 to 26 January 2013. The 4 national teams involved in the tournament are required to register a squad of 22 players. Only players in these squads are eligible to take part in the tournament.

Stage
Players' age and caps as of the opening day of the tournament.

Sweden
Head coach:   Erik Hamrén

Finland
Head coach:  Mixu Paatelainen

Thailand
Head coach:  Winfried Schäfer

North Korea
Head coach:   Yun Jong-su

External links
 King's Cup
 Football in Thailand

2013 in Thai football cups
King's Cup